Ulisse Cambi (22 September 1807 – 7 April 1895) was an Italian sculptor active in Tuscany during the 19th century.

Biography and artworks 

Son of the sculptor Pietro Cambi, he was born in Florence where he attended the courses of the local Art High School (Liceo Artistico) and then of  the Accademia. His training as a sculptor went on in Rome, where he spent 4 years.

Back in Florence after a difficult professional period he managed to get into the artistic milieu of his city. He then become professor at the Accademia, teaching sculpture and influencing several well-known Italian artists as Giovanni Dupré from Siena and Giorgio Ceragioli,  who was mainly active in Piemonte.
From the 1840s on he realised several important artworks such as the statues of Benvenuto Cellini for the ground-floor courtyard of the Ufizzi; a Monument to Carlo Goldoni located in front of Ponte alla Carraia in the quartiere of Santa Maria Novella of Florence; and the monumental fountain located in Piazza Duomo of Prato.

His funeral monuments, like the one devoted to the painter Giuseppe Sabatelli (Basilica of Santa Croce, Florence), where particularly appreciated. He completed a monument to Francesco Burlamacchi for the Piazzale San Michele in Lucca.
During his late days the prevailing realistic artistic movement made his neoclassical style becoming old-fashioned and turned away from him the favour of art criticism. He had a studio at Viale Principe Eugenio #20 in Florence. He died in Florence in 1895 at the age of 87.

References
The initial version of this article was based on a translation of its equivalent on the Italian Wikipedia, as retrieved on 2009-12-24.

1807 births
1895 deaths
Neoclassical sculptors
Sculptors from Florence
19th-century Italian sculptors
Italian male sculptors
19th-century Italian male artists